Jakob Johann Freiherr von Uexküll (– 25 July 1944) was a Baltic German biologist who worked in the fields of muscular physiology and animal behaviour studies and was an influence on the cybernetics of life. However, his most notable contribution is the notion of Umwelt, used by semiotician Thomas Sebeok and philosopher Martin Heidegger. His works established biosemiotics as a field of research.

Early life
The son of Baron Alexander von Uexküll and Sophie von Hahn, Jakob von Uexküll was born in the Keblas estate, Sankt Michaelis, Governorate of Estonia. His aristocratic family lost most of their fortune by expropriation during the Russian Revolution. Needing to support himself, Uexküll took a job as professor at the University of Hamburg where he founded the Institut für Umweltforschung.

Umwelt

Uexküll was particularly interested in how living beings perceive their environment(s). He argued that organisms experience life in terms of species-specific, spatio-temporal, "self-in-world" subjective reference frames that he called Umwelt (translated as surrounding-world, phenomenal world, self-world, environment  - lit. German environment). These Umwelten (plural of Umwelt) are distinctive from what Uexküll termed the "Umgebung" which would be the living being's surroundings as seen from the likewise peculiar perspective or Umwelt of the human observer. Umwelt may thus be defined as the perceptual world in which an organism exists and acts as a subject. By studying how the senses of various organisms like  ticks, sea urchins, amoebae, jellyfish and sea worms work, he was able to build theories of how they experience the world. Because all organisms perceive and react to sensory data as signs, Uexküll argued that they were to be considered as living subjects. This argument was the basis for his biological theory in which the characteristics of biological existence ("life") could not simply be described as a sum of its non-organic parts, but had to be described as subject and a part of a sign system.

The biosemiotic turn in Jakob von Uexküll's analysis occurs in his discussion of the animal's relationship with its environment. The Umwelt is for him an environment-world which is (according to Giorgio Agamben), "constituted by a more or less broad series of elements [called] "carriers of significance" or "marks" which are the only things that interest the animal". Agamben goes on to paraphrase one example from Uexküll's discussion of a tick, saying,

"...this eyeless animal finds the way to her watchpoint [at the top of a tall blade of grass] with the help of only its skin's general sensitivity to light. The approach of her prey becomes apparent to this blind and deaf bandit only through her sense of smell. The odor of butyric acid, which emanates from the sebaceous follicles of all mammals, works on the tick as a signal that causes her to abandon her post (on top of the blade of grass/bush) and fall blindly downward toward her prey. If she is fortunate enough to fall on something warm (which she perceives by means of an organ sensible to a precise temperature) then she has attained her prey, the warm-blooded animal, and thereafter needs only the help of her sense of touch to find the least hairy spot possible and embed herself up to her head in the cutaneous tissue of her prey. She can now slowly suck up a stream of warm blood."

Thus, for the tick, the Umwelt is reduced to only three (biosemiotic) carriers of significance: (1) The odor of butyric acid, which emanates from the sebaceous follicles of all mammals, (2) The temperature of 37 degrees Celsius (corresponding to the blood of all mammals), (3) The hairiness of mammals.

Theoretical biology

Uexküll anticipated many computer science ideas, particularly in the field of robotics, roughly 25 years before these things were invented.

Uexküll views organisms in terms of information processing. He argues every organism has an outer boundary which defines an Umwelt (German word generally meaning "environment", "surrounding world"). Rather than the general meaning, Uexküll's concept draws on the literal meaning of the German word, which is "surround-world", to define the Umwelt as the subjectively perceived surroundings about which information is available to an organism through its senses.  This is a subjective Weltanschauung, or "world view", and is therefore fundamentally different from the black box concept, which is derived from the objective Newtonian viewpoint.

The organism has sensors that report the state of the Umwelt and effectors that can change parts of the Umwelt. He distinguished the effector as the logical opposite of the sensor, or sense organ. Sensors and effectors are linked in a feedback loop. Sensor input is processed by a Merkorgan and effectors are controlled by a Werkorgan. The modern term "sensorimotor" used in enactive theories of cognition encompasses these concepts.

He further distinguishes the Umgebung (that part of the Umwelt that represents distal features of the external world, in German "that which is being given as surroundings") from the Innenwelt which is reported directly by sensors and is therefore the only unmediated reality immediately knowable to the organism. The relationship between the distal (mediated, transformed) features of the Umgebung and the proximal (untransformed, unmediated, primal) features of the Innenwelt must be learned by the organism in infancy. The nature of the Umgebung::Innenwelt relationship is relevant to the later theories of embodied cognition.

This is also similar to Kant's phenomenon and noumenon but derived logically from the properties of the sensors. What we now call a "feedback loop" he calls a "function-circle" and "circle" seems to be something like "system". He uses the term "melody" to mean something close to "algorithm". He coins around 75 technical terms, and a proper understanding of his book would require clearly defining them in modern terms and understanding their relations. He notices qualia, comes close to object-oriented programming (page 98) uses the image of a helmsman which later showed up as "cybernetics" (page 291) and makes a good guess about DNA (page 127). He has a large number of ideas, although not expressed clearly in modern terms. His metaphysics is hyper-Kantian ("All reality is subjective appearance", page xv.) Space is a set of direction symbols. He rejects Darwin and says nothing of God. Organisms are based on something called "Plan", the origin of which we cannot know.

Uexküll was an advocate of non-Darwinian evolution and critic of Darwinism. Kalevi Kull noted that "despite his opposition to Darwinism, Uexküll was not anti-evolutionist".

Influence 
Works by scholars such as Kalevi Kull connect Uexküll's studies with some areas of philosophy such as phenomenology and hermeneutics. Jakob von Uexküll's theory of biosemiotics directly influenced N. Katherine Hayles' concept of cybersemiotics.

However, despite his influence on the work of philosophers Max Scheler, Ernst Cassirer, Martin Heidegger, Maurice Merleau-Ponty, Peter Wessel Zapffe, Humberto Maturana, Georges Canguilhem, Michel Foucault, Gilles Deleuze and Félix Guattari (in their A Thousand Plateaus, for example) he is still not widely known, and his books are mostly out of print in German and in English. A paperback French translation of Streifzüge durch die Umwelten von Tieren und Menschen [A stroll through the Umwelten of animals and humans] of 1934 is currently in print.  This book has been translated in English as A Foray into the Worlds of Animals and Humans, with A Theory of Meaning by Jakob von Uexküll, translated by Joseph D. O'Neil, introduction by Dorion Sagan, University of Minnesota Press, 2011. The other available book is "Theoretical Biology", a reprint of the 1926 translation of "Theoretische Biologie" (1920). "Foray" is a popular introduction while "Theoretical Biology" is intended for an academic audience.

Family 

His sons were the physician Thure von Uexküll and journalist Gösta von Uexküll. His daughter was Sophie Luise Damajanti von Uexküll ('Dana'). His grandson is the writer Jakob von Uexküll.

Involvement with National Socialism 
In 2021 Gottfried Schnödl and Florian Sprenger proved that Uexküll was much more deeply involved in National Socialism than previously known. In 1933 he signed the Confession of German Professors to Adolf Hitler. In May 1934, together with Martin Heidegger, Carl Schmitt, and Alfred Rosenberg, among others, he was a founding member of the Committee for Philosophy of Law of the Academy for German Law, both of which were headed by Hans Frank. This committee was to accompany the National Socialist program with a philosophy of law appropriate to "Germanness." In doing so, Uexküll did not merely seek a connection to National Socialism, but actively participated in the collaborative elaboration of a National Socialist philosophy of law and attempted to substantiate it through his conception of Umwelt. Uexküll's doctrine led to a holistically based rejection of democracy and discharged itself in an identitarian logic in which everything is in its place according to plan and that which is in the wrong place should disappear.

As late as 1933 Uexküll held hopes that the rise of Hitler to power might bring an end to the expansion of communism and the democratization of German society, for which he had an aristocratic antipathy, but his expectations were met with disappointment. In May of the same year Uexküll wrote a letter to Eva Wagner Chamberlain, daughter of Richard Wagner, and wife of his late friend Houston Stewart Chamberlain, lamenting that the ideas of her husband were being used by Nazism to justify the persecution of Jews in Germany, and describing racial discrimination against Jews as "the worst kind of barbarism". By the autumn of 1933, Uexküll evinced disapproval of Nazi policy and ideology, and afterwards tried to avoid political issues, although it sometimes proved impossible. In 1934, Uexküll dedicated his book A Foray into the Worlds of Animals and Humans to a Jewish fellow researcher Otto Cohnheim, who, in his words, "lost his appointment as a university professor because of racial politics".

Following the publication of Sprengers and Schnödls book, there have been discussions about Uexkülls role in the early 1930s.  As Sprenger and Schnödl show, there are no reliable historical sources for many of the assumptions that have been used to defend Uexküll. These anecdotes are taken from a biography of Uexküll written by his wife, Gudrun von Uexküll, in 1964. This book defends Uexküll against all accusations, but does not give any reliable sources or references. For example, Carlos Brentari  refers to Uexkülls autobiographical book of personal reminiscences, Nie geschaute Welten (Worlds never seen). Brentari argues that in this book, Uexküll wrote favorably of the Russian Jews and the Baroness Rothschild. He even states that the book officially banned from display in bookshop windows. This assumption has turned out wrong: The book is not listed on any of the National Socialist's lists of banned books. And, contrary to Brentari, Uexküll takes up the idea of the Jews as "parasitic plants" which only grow where they belong. As Sprenger writes: "This rhetoric already holds the germ of the idea that the host must rid itself of this parasite, despite all sympathies he may harbor for individual members of the alien race, and thus end the supposed abuse of his hospitality. It is precisely because the Jewish population is understood as a parasite that it can, in Uexküll's representation, be so easily expelled: transplanted elsewhere, it will be able to live just as well; but there, too, it may also spread parasitically."

In popular culture
Uexküll's ideas about how organisms create their own concept of time are described in Peter Høeg's novel Borderliners, and contrasted with Isaac Newton's view of time as something that exists independent of life.

See also
List of Baltic German scientists
Jakob von Uexküll Centre
Copenhagen–Tartu school

References

Cited sources and other sources
 Thure von Uexküll. 1987. "The sign theory of Jakob von Uexküll." In: Krampen et al. 1987. Classics of Semiotics. New York: Plenum, pp. 147–179.
 Jakob von Uexküll, Mondes animaux et monde humain, 
 Jakob von Uexküll, "A Stroll Through the Worlds of Animals and Men: A Picture Book of Invisible Worlds." In Instinctive Behavior: The Development of a Modern Concept, edited and translated by Claire H. Schiller, New York: International Universities Press, 1957, pp. 5–80.
 Jakob von Uexküll, A Foray Into the Worlds of Animals and Humans: With a Theory of Meaning, translated by Joseph D. O'Neil, Minneapolis/London: University of Minnesota Press, 2010.
 Jakob von Uexküll, Theoretical Biology, New York: Harcourt, Brace & Co., 1926.
 Donald Favareau, "Jakob von Uexküll (1864–1944)." Essential Readings in Biosemiotics: Anthology and Commentary. Dordrecht: Springer, pp. 81–89.
 Max Scheler, "Formalism in Ethics and Non-Formal Ethics of Values: A New Attempt Toward the Foundation of an Ethical Personalism" (1913-1916): Northwestern University Press (September 1, 1973). 
Martin Heidegger, The Fundamental Concepts of Metaphysics: World, Finitude, Solitude. Bloomington/Indianapolis: Indiana University Press, 1995, pp. 224, 241, 261–67.
 Kalevi Kull, "Jakob von Uexküll: An introduction". Semiotica vol. 134: 1–59, 2001. [Includes complete bibliography of Uexküll.]
 Giorgio Agamben, Chapter 10, "Umwelt" in The Open: Man and Animal, translated by Kevin Attell (Originally published in Italian in 2002 under the title L'aperto: l'uomo e l'animale), Stanford, CA: Stanford University Press, 2004. 
 Carlo Brentari, Jakob von Uexküll. The Discovery of the Umwelt between Biosemiotics and Theoretical Biology, translated by Catriona Graciet (Originally published in Italian in 2011 under the title Jakob von Uexküll. Alle origini dell'antropologia filosofica), Dordrecht/Heidelberg/New York/London: Springer, 2015. 
 It from bit and fit from bit.  On the origin and impact of information in the average evolution (Yves Decadt, 2000). Book published in Dutch with English paper summary in The Information Philosopher, http://www.informationphilosopher.com/solutions/scientists/decadt/
 Thure von Uexküll. 1992. "Introduction: The sign theory of Jakob von Uexküll". Semiotica 89(4): 279–315.
 Jui-Pi Chien. 2007. "Umwelt, milieu(x), and environment: A survey of cross-cultural concept mutations". Semiotica 167–1/4, 65–89.

External links

 
 Jakob von Uexküll page at the Semiotics Department of the University of Tartu
 Jakob von Uexküll, Institute for theoretical biology, biocybernetics and biosemiotics at the university of Hamburg
 Jakob von Uexküll, Theoretical Biology, Biocybernetics and Biosemiotics (Journal article) 
 Jakob von Uexküll and his "Institut für Umweltforschung in Hamburg" (PPT - Presentation)
 Excerpts from "The Theory of Meaning" and "A Stroll Through the Worlds of Animals and Men" in English
 

1864 births
1944 deaths
Baltic-German people
Academic staff of the University of Hamburg
Cyberneticists
Enactive cognition
Ethologists
Members of the Academy for German Law
Non-Darwinian evolution
People from Lääneranna Parish
People from the Governorate of Estonia
Privy Councillor (Russian Empire)
Semioticians
Theoretical biologists
20th-century German biologists